The Journal of Industrial Economics is a quarterly peer-reviewed academic journal on industrial economics topics. It was established in 1952 to advance the analysis of modern industrial economics so the focus is on topics related to oligopoly] theory, product differentiation, industrial structural change, corporate theory, market regulation, monopoly theory, mergers and acquisitions and technology policy. According to the Journal Citation Reports, the journal has a 2021 impact factor of 1.054.

Editors
The editor-in-chief is Patrick Legros (Université libre de Bruxelles). He has headed the journal since 2013.

See also
List of economics journals

References

External links

Economics journals